Leiocephalus endomychus, commonly known as the Hinche curlytail or central Haitian curlytail, is a species of lizard in the family Leiocephalidae (curly-tailed lizard). It is native to Haiti, although fossils are known from Barbuda and Antigua.

References

Leiocephalus
Reptiles described in 1967
Reptiles of Haiti
Taxa named by Albert Schwartz (zoologist)